Lucifer is the name of two unrelated fictional characters appearing in American comic books published by Marvel Comics. One is an alien supervillain of the X-Men and the other is a villain of Ghost Rider and is referred to as the Prince of Darkness.

Publication history
The first Lucifer first appearance was in The X-Men #9 and was created by Stan Lee and Jack Kirby. He is an agent of the Quists, an alien race who are also known as the Arcane.

Fictional character biography

Lucifer (Quists)

An alien, the being known as Lucifer was born on the planet Quistalium, in the Quistraa star system in the Milky Way Galaxy, who had invaded many worlds. He first came to Earth as an advance agent for the invasion of Earth by the Arcane (also known as the Quists), and succeeded in placing some humans under hypnotic control, allowing him to take control of a small area. This invasion, however, was foiled by the young Charles Xavier (later Professor X, leader of the X-Men). In retaliation, Lucifer dropped an enormous stone block on Xavier, leaving his legs paralyzed so that he would need a wheelchair.

Lucifer made several later attempts to conquer Earth, all foiled by the X-Men or other heroes, although one of his attempts did force the first X-Men team to confront the Avengers due to a misunderstanding.

Lucifer returned to Earth years after paralyzing Xavier, and battled Professor Xavier once again in the Balkan Mountains, where he revealed a device attached to his heart would set off a bomb if he was killed. Lucifer later manipulated the Blob and Unus into framing the X-Men as criminals. He revealed how he rendered Xavier a paraplegic years ago. He was thwarted by the X-Men who defeated his robot, and teleported from Earth by the Quistalian Supreme one for punishment.

Lucifer was exiled to an alternate realm known as the "Nameless Dimension". There, he somehow used "ionic energy" to give himself superhuman strength and the ability to project force beams from his hands, in addition to his apparently pre-existing telepathic powers.  He continued to try conquering Earth by using his "dimensional transmitter" to imbue humans with ionic energy and turning them into his minions. He first "fused" with Charlie Gray, although Gray fought and defeated Lucifer. Lucifer later fused simultaneously with criminal Rafe Michel and Aries of the Zodiac crime cartel. Michel and Aries fought Captain America and the Falcon. Lucifer became trapped in the "Nameless Dimension" again when both hosts died. Lucifer's masters ultimately apparently "terminated" him for his failures, and replaced him with the computer Dominus.

Lucifer (Prince of Darkness)

Lucifer is a fictional character, a supervillain in Marvel Comics and mostly associated with Ghost Rider.

Lucifer possesses a vast array of powers. Deception, suggestion and manipulation are quite appealing to this creature, but he is not above tearing his opponents apart with his bare claws.

Lucifer has kept his true history mysterious throughout the years through deceit and deception. It is believed that he was once an angel who led other angels in banishing the N'Garai from Earth and led a group of followers in a rebellion against God during the great war in Heaven, thus essentially representing the true "devil" in the Marvel Universe of Christian theology. Following his defeat, Lucifer and his lieutenants Beelzeboul, Kazann, Malachi, Pazuzu, Xaphan and others were all cast down to Hell as punishment. During this time, he became the demon known as the Prince of Lies, ruling a realm in Hell.

In Hell, Lucifer looked nothing like the angel he once was. He and all of his Lieutenants had degenerated into demons; some through instruction, others adapted more naturally. But they had all over time changed into twisted creatures of evil.

A long battle has been fought between the demon Ghost Rider and the Prince of Lies. Lucifer believed (as have others) that if he could extinguish the human soul that lives within the Ghost Rider, the latter could be made into a soulless killing machine that could be used to extinguish all humanity. Later he introduces many more reasons to defeat Johnny Blaze. For years, Lucifer with the aid of the other Hell-lords had made many attempts on Ghost Rider's soul, but all have failed. Lucifer had decided to take matters into his own hands. Satan wanted to capitalize on this particular demon as well as to join in for his own purposes. But in the end Ghost Rider proved he was a very strong demon indeed.

Lucifer is ultimately defeated by Blaze and exiled back to Perdition, and senses Zadkiel's apparent triumph over Heaven from Hell. However, after Zadkiel is unable to truly control Creation and the ultimate power that sparked it, the one true God returns in wrath and condemns the renegade archangel to Hell for all eternity, to be forever tortured by a pleased Lucifer. 

During a later storyline, Lucifer is able to escape from Hell by 'following' Ghost Rider during his latest escape from Hell, with the transition splintering Lucifer's soul into 666 fragments, which 'manifest' on Earth in the bodies of those who had recently died at the moment Ghost Rider crossed over, with these including the latest Jack O'Lantern. Lucifer would regain his full strength if he can arrange for his various hosts to be killed by others; he cannot commit suicide as this is a sin that would send him back to Hell, but as each Lucifer fragment dies, their strengths are transferred to the other hosts, until eventually the last few hosts will be so powerful only Ghost Rider can kill him, at which point the last 'living' Lucifer would serve as the final manifestation of Lucifer himself. Eventually, the Ghost Rider is able to 'kill' one Lucifer fragment by ramming a truck's gear-stick through its brain and breaking its spine, leaving the fragment in a brain-damaged and paralysed state but biologically still alive, allowing Ghost Rider to defeat what Lucifer believes to be his final host because it is still at half-strength, the brain-dead final host being killed by Ghost Rider's ally Dixie- a trucker Blaze had befriended earlier- and the police.

As the Chaos King launches his invasion of the divine and infernal realms associated with Earth at the start of the "Chaos War" storyline, the last surviving bastion of Creation, Lucifer, along with the other powers of Hell, confronts Mikaboshi, only to be defeated and consumed by the overwhelming might of his primordial darkness.

Powers and abilities
The Quist version of Lucifer has a gifted intellect, and extensive knowledge of advanced Quistalian science and technology, and talent as an inventor using this technology. Lucifer has acquired the ability to manipulate ionic energy for various effects, including enhancing his physical strength and leaping ability to superhuman levels, creating protective force fields, and projecting powerful concussive bolts. Lucifer could also "fuse" his physical and mental "essence" with another sentient being. In doing so, Lucifer created a psychic link between himself and his "host." The "host" retained his own will but was in constant psychic contact with Lucifer. The "fusion" endowed the host with some of Lucifer's superhuman powers for as long as the merger lasted. Lucifer could fuse with at least two hosts simultaneously. Lucifer also had limited telepathic abilities, and had the ability to create and maintain a psychic link with his host or hosts while fused with them. Lucifer used a ray gun firing unknown forms of destructive energy. He later made use of Dominus, a highly advanced computer complex created by the Arcane that could blanket a world with mind-deadening rays, enabling the Arcane to enslave its populace. Dominus was operated by "Ultra-robots," which could fly and project destructive energy beams. Lucifer also used teleportation devices for transportation. All of this paraphernalia was designed by Lucifer himself and Quistalian scientists.

The demon version of Lucifer can create interdimensional portals, perform image projection, demonic possession, do mystical force blasts, illusion casting, shapeshifting, sizeshifting, matter manipulation, raising the dead, manipulating the dead, and regenerating the corpses of those he inhabits. Lucifer doesn't need to eat, drink, or sleep. He is also immune to aging and disease.

In other media
In the novel Shadows of the Past by Michael Jan Friedman, the alien Lucifer is revealed to be alive, capturing Professor X and replacing him with an ionic energy duplicate, the duplicate possessing the real Xavier's memories and powers while nevertheless unquestionably loyal to Lucifer. In the process, Luficer also traps Xavier in the Nameless Dimension with him, the Nameless Dimension being depicted as a featureless realm filled with a thick liquid-like substance that Lucifer and Xavier can 'breathe' as though they are still inhaling oxygen. Although Lucifer is able to create beings made of pure ionic energy, his ability to create such beings is apparently limited, and they are of limited capabilities; two such beings were able to defeat Xavier and Iceman and abduct Xavier only because they had the element of surprise and raw power as well as being immune to telepathy. Due to the limitations of these constructs and his own twisted sense of irony, Lucifer has the duplicate Xavier use the original X-Men as his agents, sending them to acquire three components from Quistalian outposts around the globe. The duplicate Xavier intends to use these components to alter the machine that had sent the Professor into the Nameless Dimension so that it could be used to allow Lucifer to return to Earth, the duplicate claiming to the X-Men that he could use those components to devise a machine to protect Earth from future Quistalian invasion. Xavier attempts to warn his students, but although he can telepathically penetrate the dimensional barrier to witness events back on Earth, his abilities are subsequently too weak to access the complex minds of either Beast or Jean Grey. Fortunately, Xavier was able to make contact with Jeffery Saunders, the mentally handicapped grandson of a recently deceased friend, whose limited mental state made him more 'open' to Xavier's influence. Using Jeffrey's physically superior body - the young boy being an exceptional athlete despite his mental state - the Professor was able to alert the X-Men to the deception when the duplicate Xavier just tried to have Jeffrey sent home when he first came to the mansion; Iceman had witnessed the real Xavier interacting with Jeremy at his grandfather's funeral, and was struck by how the duplicate was acting far more distant towards Jeffrey. With the duplicate Xavier captured, Xavier-in-Jeffrey accompanied the X-Men when they departed to retrieve the final component, and was later able to defeat an ionic duplicate of Archangel - created after the original was injured and captured while they were investigating one of the facilities - that could have allowed Lucifer to use the newly modified portal to return to their dimension. Although Xavier was briefly tempted to destroy the machine when he thought that Lucifer might be able to reach the exit portal before him, Jeffrey was able to help him escape by 'sending' the Professor his own youthful energy back along their psychic link, giving Xavier the strength to beat Lucifer to the portal in a swimming race, the portal being deactivated just as Lucifer's hand attempted to emerge after Xavier. With Xavier's return, the machine was destroyed by Cyclops and the duplicate Professor X is found to have ceased to exist, leaving Lucifer to fume and plot his revenge in the Nameless Dimension once again.

References

External links
 Lucifer at Marvel.com
 Lucifer at Comic Vine
 
 

Characters created by Jack Kirby
Characters created by Stan Lee
Comics characters introduced in 1965
Mythology in Marvel Comics
Marvel Comics aliens
Marvel Comics characters with superhuman strength
Marvel Comics demons
Marvel Comics devils
Marvel Comics extraterrestrial supervillains
Marvel Comics supervillains
Marvel Comics telepaths
Fiction about the Devil